Rafael Vaz dos Santos (born 17 September 1988) is a Brazilian footballer who plays as a centre back for São Bernardo.

Career

Flamengo
On 8 June 2016 Flamengo signed Rafael after his contract with Vasco da Gama expired.

Universidad de Chile (loan)
On 25 January 2018 Flamengo loaned Vaz to Universidad de Chile until the end of 2018.

Career statistics
(Correct .)

Honours
Ceará
Campeonato Cearense: 2013

Vasco da Gama
Campeonato Carioca: 2015, 2016

Flamengo
Campeonato Carioca: 2017

References

External links

1988 births
Living people
Brazilian footballers
Brazilian expatriate footballers
Campeonato Brasileiro Série A players
Campeonato Brasileiro Série B players
Campeonato Brasileiro Série C players
Chilean Primera División players
Qatar Stars League players
Sociedade Esportiva Palmeiras players
Clube Atlético Votuporanguense players
Paraná Clube players
Vila Nova Futebol Clube players
Ceará Sporting Club players
CR Vasco da Gama players
CR Flamengo footballers
Universidad de Chile footballers
Goiás Esporte Clube players
Al-Khor SC players
Avaí FC players
São Bernardo Futebol Clube players
Expatriate footballers in Chile
Brazilian expatriate sportspeople in Chile
Expatriate footballers in Qatar
Brazilian expatriate sportspeople in Qatar
Association football defenders
People from Caieiras
Footballers from São Paulo (state)